The Treaty of Pondicherry was signed in 1754 bringing an end to the Second Carnatic War. It was agreed and signed in the French settlement of Puducherry in French India. The favoured British candidate Mohamed Ali Khan Walajan was recognized as the Nawab of the Carnatic. Despite intending to be a lasting solution, a Third Carnatic War broke out just two years later in 1756.

See also
 France in the Seven Years War
 Great Britain in the Seven Years' War

References

Bibliography
 Keay, John. The Honourable Company: A History of the English East India Company. Harper Collins, 1993.

Peace treaties of India
1754 treaties
Peace treaties of the Kingdom of Great Britain
Peace treaties of the Ancien Régime
Treaties of the Nawab of the Carnatic
History of Puducherry
1754 in India
18th century in French India
1754 in British law